Crossfire is a comic book series created by writer Mark Evanier and artist Dan Spiegle originally for Eclipse Comics. It was a spin-off from DNAgents, which was also written by Evanier, set in the Image Universe.

Plot
The series featured the adventures of a Los Angeles bail bondsman named Jay Endicott; Endicott assumed the identity of the original Crossfire, a notorious criminal, who was murdered in the midst of one of his crimes. Endicott decided to use the costume to fight crime as a superhero while impersonating the original to take advantage of his reputation to secure, and then hunt down, underworld contacts.

The original Crossfire, Jeff Baker, first appeared in DNAgents #4. Jay Endicott first appeared in DNAgents #9.

In an early adventure, Endicott met the DNAgents and fell in love with their member, Rainbow. He was also seriously wounded and while in the care of the Agents' organization, he was given specific enhancements to his body such as replacing his blood with an artificial chemical that mimics the characteristics of blood more efficiently.

In addition to the superhero adventures, Evanier used his considerable experience in the Hollywood entertainment industry to feature secondary stories of characters trying to work and survive in that business. Evanier also contributed lengthy essays on the subject in each issue with illustrations by Sergio Aragones, a tradition continued in the later series, Hollywood Superstars for Epic Comics.

The character Jay Endicott was also the lead in a short-lived spin-off from Eclipse Comics, "Whodunnit?". Lasting for three issues, the book featured "fair play" whodunit murder mystery tales solved by Crossfire's civil identity as a bailout officer and invited readers to submit their guesses for later publication and comment.

Publication history
The series originally ran for 26 issues, but sold poorly. This prompted a change of format from color to black and white printing to reduce expense. In turn, the series took a more realistic tone to the stories such as Endicott having to make do with only his mask after he was forced to destroy the rest of his costume to escape police custody.

In 1994 Antarctic Press published a one shot flip book DNAgents Super Special that included a new Crossfire story by Evanier and Spiegle. About Comics in 2004 released a black and white digest size collection of the first five issues (plus one issue of the tie-in series Whodunnit?) under the title Crossfire Volume 1: Hollywood Hero. The plans to produce further volumes were shelved due to unstable conditions in the comic book market at the time.

The series had a new 8-page story in the one-shot comic book Many Happy Returns from About Comics in March 2008.

See also
 Hollywood Superstars: a later series for Epic Comics imprint of Marvel Comics by the same creators with a similar narrative theme without the superhero element.

References

External links
Crossfire on Mark Evanier's personal website 

Eclipse Comics characters